Nadadouro is one of twelve civil parishes (freguesias) in the municipality of Caldas da Rainha, Portugal. The population in 2011 was 1,904, in an area of 10.60 km².

The parish of Nadadouro borders the popular tourist destination of the Lagoa de Óbidos which is a lagoon located in the municipalities Óbidos and Caldas da Rainha, Portugal. It empties into the Atlantic Ocean at Foz do Arelho.

Villages 

Alto
Alto Nobre
Barrosa
Casal Avé Maria
Casais de Baixo
Casal das Salgueiras
Casal dos Chãos
Cumeira
Casal Novo
Casais da Fonte
Corujeira
Casais do Vale de Égua
Casais do Regato
Casinhas
Cercas
Covões
Poça dos Ninhos
Panascosas
Pedreirinha
Touguio

References

Freguesias of Caldas da Rainha